"Ai Deshita." is a release by the Japanese boyband Kanjani8. The single was announced on April 17, 2012, as the theme song of the TBS drama, "Papa Doru" which starred the group's own Nishikido Ryo in the lead, and that it would be on sale sometime in June. On May 11, 2012, official information and details were released on the single stating that there would be two versions of the release, a limited and regular edition, and that the single will officially be sold on June 13, 2012. On May 18, the jacket details were released and on May 31, information about a lottery tickets inserted in the single towards a free live at Osaka's Kyocera Dome were also announced.

The song, Ai Deshita., is a standard pop-rock ballad. It incorporates guitars, drums, and strings into the overall composition. Vocally, the song is split with harmonies between Ryuhei Maruyama and Yuu Yokoyama, Shota Yasuda and Shingo Murakami, and Subaru Shibutani and Ryo Nishikido on lead. Along with Shibutani and Nishikido, Tadayoshi Ohkura also sings solo verses.

Music video

Development and release

The short version music video for "Ai Deshita." was debuted on m-on's Sukidori on May 31, 2011.

Synopsis 

The music video opens up with Nishikido sleeping on a leather couch in an empty apartment. The video then cuts to the band performing in an empty field before jump cutting between each member singing against a white wall. The video then continues to alternate between band scenes, solo shots against the white wall, and scenes of each member interacting with each other in the apartment or outside the apartment. The short version of the music video fades out during the instrumental break.

Track listing

Regular Edition
  
 
 "Merry Go Round"
  
  
  
 "Merry Go Round (Original Karaoke)"

Limited Edition

DVD

"Ai Deshita." Music Clip and Making

References

2012 singles
Kanjani Eight songs
Japanese television drama theme songs
Oricon Weekly number-one singles
Billboard Japan Hot 100 number-one singles
2012 songs